The Georgia national rugby union team has competed in five consecutive Rugby World Cup tournaments. Starting in 2003, they were placed in Pool C with eventual winners England, South Africa, Uruguay and Samoa, where they lost all four matches. Georgia qualified for the 2007 World Cup and were placed in Pool D with Argentina, France, Ireland and Namibia, where they beat Namibia. In 2011 Rugby World Cup, Georgia qualified for their third straight tournament. They were placed in Pool B with Scotland, England, Argentina and Romania and won the game against rivals Romania. Their best performance was in 2015 tournament, when they were drawn against eventual world champions New Zealand, Argentina, Tonga and Namibia. Georgia won games against Tonga and Namibia, finished third in the group and automatically qualified for 2019 Rugby World Cup.

World Cup record

By matches

2003

Group C matches -

2007

2011

2015

2019

Overall record

Team records

Most points scored in a game – 33 vs  (2019)

Biggest winning margin – 30 vs  (2007)

Most points conceded in a game – 84 vs  (2003)

Biggest losing margin – 78 vs  (2003)

Most tries scored in a game – 5 vs  (2019)

Most tries conceded in a game – 12 vs  (2003)

Individual records
Most World Cup matches – 15 Mamuka Gorgodze

Most Points Overall – 86 Merab Kvirikashvili

Most points in a game – 17 vs  - Merab Kvirikashvili 2011

Most tries overall – 4 Mamuka Gorgodze

Most tries in a game – 
1 vs  – David Dadunashvili 2003
1 vs  – George Shkinin 2007
1 vs  – Akvsenti Giorgadze 2007
1 vs  – Irakli Machkhaneli 2007
1 vs  – Davit Kacharava 2007
1 vs  – Zviad Maissuradze 2007
1 vs  – Dimitri Basilaia 2011
1 vs  – Mamuka Gorgodze 2011
1 vs  – Lasha Khmaladze 2011
1 vs  – Mamuka Gorgodze 2015
1 vs  – Giorgi Tkhilaishvili 2015
1 vs  – Beka Tsiklauri 2015
1 vs  – Mamuka Gorgodze 2015
1 vs  – Lasha Malaghuradze 2015
1 vs  – Shalva Mamukashvili 2019
1 vs  – Levan Chilachava 2019
1 vs  – Alexander Todua 2019
1 vs  – Otar Giorgadze 2019
1 vs  – Levan Chilachava 2019
1 vs  – Jaba Bregvadze 2019
1 vs  – Giorgi Kveseladze 2019
1 vs  – Mamuka Gorgodze 2019
1 vs  – Alexander Todua 2019

Most penalty goals – 22 Merab Kvirikashvili

Most penalty goals in a game – 5 vs  – Merab Kvirikashvili 2011

Most drop goals – 1 Paliko Jimsheladze

Most drop goals in a game – 1 vs  – Paliko Jimsheladze 2003

References

 Davies, Gerald (2004) The History of the Rugby World Cup (Sanctuary Publishing Ltd,
 Farr-Jones, Nick, (2003). Story of the Rugby World Cup, Australian Post Corporation,

Rugby World Cup by nation
World Cup